Barcino is a village in the administrative district of Gmina Kępice, within Słupsk County, Pomeranian Voivodeship, in northern Poland.

The village has a population of 577.

See also
History of Pomerania

References

Barcino